Mkhacani Joseph (Joe) Maswanganyi (born 14 April 1966) is a South African politician who was the Minister of Transport of South Africa from 31 March 2017 to 26 February 2018, serving in the Second Cabinet of Jacob Zuma.

He is a member of the ruling party ANC National Executive Committee member and former ANCYL deputy president.  and a member of the National Assembly of South Africa (Parliament) since 27 May 2015.

External links

 Profile at Parliament of South Africa

References

1966 births
Living people
African National Congress politicians
Government ministers of South Africa
Members of the National Assembly of South Africa
Members of the Limpopo Provincial Legislature